Re-cycle (Cantonese: 鬼域 Gwai wik) is a 2006 horror film directed by the Pang Brothers and starring Angelica Lee. The film was the closing film in the Un Certain Regard program at the 2006 Cannes Film Festival. It was also a reunion for the Pangs and the actress Lee, who starred in the Pangs' 2002 hit The Eye. It is a Hong Kong/Thai co-production.

Plot
Ting-yin, a young novelist, is struggling to come up with a follow-up to her best-selling trilogy of romance novels. She has not even started on the book yet and her agent has already announced that the next title, The Recycle, will deal with the supernatural.

After drafting her first chapter, she stops and deletes the file from her computer. She then starts seeing strange, unexplainable things and finds that she is experiencing the supernatural events that she described in her novel-to-be.

Cast
 Angelica Lee as Ting-yin/Chu Xun
 Lawrence Chou as Abby
 Siu-Ming Lau
 Rain Li
 Jetrin Wattanasin
 Cheang Pou-soi

Controversy
Ting-yin finds herself in a parallel universe where abandoned things end up, including aborted fetuses, which combined with the portrayal of the main character's personal demons regarding her own aborted child leads some critics to believe the film carries an anti-abortion message. "That just happens to be one of the topics in the movie. We are not out to say if abortion is right or wrong", Oxide Pang said in one interview.

References

External links
 
 
 
 Re-cycle at the 2006 Cannes Film Festival

Cantonese-language films
2000s Mandarin-language films
2006 films
Hong Kong horror films
Thai supernatural horror films
Hong Kong supernatural horror films
2006 horror films
2000s Hong Kong films